Boris Archive is a three disc collection of live material by Japanese band Boris. The first disc comprises various live renditions of older songs and material from Amplifier Worship and the Boris/Barebones split EP. The second disc is three drumless drone songs. The third disc is a live set consisting of the 65-minute Absolutego and the 70-minute Flood played back-to-back in 37 minutes. Altogether, 600 copies of each disc were pressed with the intention of being sold individually. However, due to strong demand for all three, a set consisting of an obi-style horizontal slipcase enclosing the three discs was created and limited to 320 copies.

All 3 discs were re-released together in 2013 through Daymare Recordings with new artwork.

Disc 1: "Live 96-98"

Recording

 Tracks 1-2 recorded December 21, 1996 at Koenji 20000V
 Tracks 3-5 recorded June 21, 1996 at Koenji 20000V
 Tracks 6-7 recorded October 4, 1997 at Shinjyuku Loft
 Track 8 recorded August 2, 1998 at Koenji 20000V

Disc 2: "Drumless Shows"

Recording

 Track 1 recorded August 9, 1997, at Nagoya Music Farm
 Tracks 2-3 recorded August 8, 1997, at Koenji 20000V

Disc 3: "2 Long Songs"

Recording

 Recorded May 3, 2001 at Koenji 20000V

Pressing history

References

External links
 aRCHIVE

Boris (band) live albums
Live album series
2005 live albums
2000s live albums
2005 compilation albums